Anthony Hammer (born circa 1987) is an Australian actor, known for his acting career starring in roles such as Leo Hancock on the Australian soap opera Neighbours. He joined the cast in 2001, but 18 months later, the entire on-screen Hancock family left. Afterwards, he finished school and relocated to the UK, where he went on to appear as a main character in the BAFTA (British Academy of Television and Arts) award-winning show BBC production of the Alex Shearer book Bootleg. He later became a semi-professional footballer.

External links

Australian male television actors
Australian male child actors
1987 births
Living people